The Guaymas Fault, named for the city of Guaymas, Sonora, Mexico, is a major right lateral-moving transform fault which runs along the seabed of the Gulf of California.  It is an integral part of the Gulf of California Rift Zone, the northern extremity of the East Pacific Rise.  The Guaymas Fault runs from the San Pedro Martir Basin located at the southern end of the San Lorenzo Fault (the next transform to the north), and extends southward to the Guaymas Basin, a heavily sedimented rift which includes both continental and oceanic crust and contains numerous hydrothermal vents.

The Guaymas Fault is often grouped together with the three transform faults to its north as the Guaymas Transform Fault System.  These faults are, from north to south, the Ballenas, Partida, San Lorenzo, and Guaymas.  This system of fault extends some 325 km, linking the Delfin Basin in the north with the Guaymas Basin in the south.

References

 The NARS-Baja Seismic Array in the Gulf of California Rift Zone, Clayton, R. W., et al. (2004), Margins Newsletter
 A Brief Review of Heat-Flow Studies in the Guaymas Basin, Gulf of California, Chapter 33, Part VI, Hydrothermal Processes, K. Becker, A. T. Fisher, AAPG Special Volumes, Volume M 47: The Gulf and Peninsular Province of the Californias, Pages 709–720 (1991)
 Microbial Utilization of Naturally Occurring Hydrocarbons at the Guaymas Basin Hydrothermal Vent Site, Bazylinski et al (1989)
 Relationship of the Puertecitos Volcanic Province Baja California Mexico to the Development of the Plate Boundary in the Gulf of California, Joann M. Stock (2000), in SPE, Geological Society of America, p.143
 Late Miocene volcanism and marine incursions in the San Lorenzo Archipelago, Gulf of California, Mexico, Escalona-Alcázar et al (2001), map p.113 

Geology of Mexico
Strike-slip faults
Geography of Mexico
Gulf of California